Héctor Alberto Álvarez (1923–1975), better known under his pen name of H. A. Murena, was an Argentine writer, essayist, poet, and translator. He wrote over twenty books on various topics, and was an important disseminator of German thought into the Spanish-speaking world. He is perhaps best remembered for Las Leyes de la Noche (1958), translated into English as The Laws of the Night. In addition to his books, Murena was a contributor to the Argentinian literary review Sur, and to Argentinian newspaper La Nación.

Murena was married to Argentine author Sara Gallardo from 1970 until his death in 1975.

Works
First Testament (Primer testamento), 1946
Fragments of the secret annals (Fragmentos de los anales secretos), 1948
The fate of the bodies ( La fatalidad de los cuerpos), 1955
Homo Atomicus (Homo atómicus), 1962
Essays on subversion (Ensayos sobre subversión), 1962
The original sin of America (El pecado original de América), 1965
The secret name (El nombre secreto), 1969
Epitalámica, 1969
The prison of the mind (La cárcel de la mente), 1971
Metaphor and the sacred (La metáfora y lo sagrado), 1973

References

1923 births
1975 deaths
Argentine male writers